Little Rissington is a village and civil parish about  south of Stow-on-the-Wold in the Cotswold District of Gloucestershire, England. The 2011 Census recorded the parish's population as 280.

Parish church
The oldest part of the Church of England parish church of St Peter is the 13th-century chancel. The nave has two 14th-century windows and the chancel has a 14th-century piscina. The font and tower are 15th-century. There was also a 15th-century rood loft, of which the stone Tudor arch to the stairs now remains. The church is a Grade II* listed building.

RAF station
RAF Little Rissington is an RAF station partly in Little Rissington parish.

Notes

Further reading

External links
Little Rissington

Civil parishes in Gloucestershire
Villages in Gloucestershire